Blind Willow, Sleeping Woman is a 2022 internationally co-produced animated film written, produced, directed and composed by Pierre Földes. A co-production between France, Luxembourg, the Netherlands and Canada, the film, set in Tokyo shortly after the 2011 Tōhoku earthquake and tsunami, adapts 6 short stories from three short story collections by Japanese author Haruki Murakami, Blind Willow, Sleeping Woman, The Elephant Vanishes and After The Quake, focusing on a bank employee who is enlisted by a talking frog to assist him in saving the city from destruction by a giant subterranean worm. To create a version of 3D motion capture animation within a 2D film, Földes filmed his entire screenplay as a live-action "reference" performance, following which the animators replaced the actors' heads with 3D models and then traced and animated their facial expressions.

The film's voice cast includes Marcello Arroyo, Michael Czyz, Zag Dorison, Pierre Földes, Jesse Noah Gruman, Katharine King So, John Vamvas, Nadia Verrucci and Shoshana Wilder.

The film premiered in the feature film competition at the 2022 Annecy International Animation Film Festival, where it was awarded a Jury Distinction, and was later screened at the 2022 Toronto International Film Festival as part of the festival's Contemporary World Cinema section.

Blind Willow, Sleeping Woman, the feature debut of composer Pierre Földes (son of Oscar®-nominated pioneer of computer animation, Peter Foldes), will have its U.S. theatrical premiere on Friday, April 14, 2023, at Film Forum.

References

External links

2022 films
2022 animated films
Canadian animated feature films
French animated feature films
Animated films set in Tokyo
Films based on works by Haruki Murakami
Films based on short fiction
2020s Canadian films
2020s French films